Hawaii Route 440 is a  state highway on the island of Lanai in Hawaii.

Route description
It is designated as the Kaumalapau Highway and Manele Road. Both termini are at the ocean, and not directly with other roads.  The road begins at Manele Harbor and leads steeply uphill in a northerly direction to Lāna'i City. It has only regional importance, linking the tourist area on the south coast with the only town on the island and the Lanai Airport.

Major junctions

References

 0440